Li Ting Lang is a 1920 American silent drama film directed by Charles Swickard and produced by Sessue Hayakawa's Haworth Pictures Corporation. The film was based on the short story Li Ting Lang, Chinese Gentleman, by  Howard P. Rockey, which was published in the December 1916 issue of The Green Book Magazine.

Plot
Li Ting Lang is a Chinese prince studying at an American university. His classmates called him "Old Ting-a-Ling" and don't know that he is royalty. Li falls in love with wealthy Marion Halstead, who had been dating one of his college friends.

LI and Marion announce their engagement, but Marion is socially ostracized, so Li releases her from her promise to him. He then considers suicide. An emissary comes to America with instructions to force Li to return to China, so he drugs the prince, and Li wakes up on a ship bound for his homeland. His college friends believe the missing student killed himself. Years later Marion marries the other man who had been courting her.

During the Chinese revolution Li Tang Lang becomes a general of the revolutionary army. Marion goes to China on her honeymoon, sees and recognizes Li. She goes to his home, but is followed by men who plan to murder her and blame her death on the general. Li Ting Lang defends Marion, and she leaves China with her husband.

Cast
Sessue Hayakawa as Li Ting Lang
Allan Forrest as Rob Murray
Charles Mason as Red Dalton (credited as Charles E. Mason)
Doris Pawn as Marion Halstead
Frances Raymond as Priscilla Mayhew
Marc Robbins as Prince Nu Chang

References

External links

 
Story film is based on – Li Ting Lang, Chinese Gentleman, The Green Book Magazine, December 1916

1920 films
American silent feature films
American black-and-white films
Haworth Pictures Corporation films
1920 drama films
Films directed by Charles Swickard
Silent American drama films
Film Booking Offices of America films
1920s American films
Films with screenplays by Richard Schayer